Non homologué is a 1985 album recorded by French artist Jean-Jacques Goldman. It was his fourth studio album and was released in September 1985. Goldman composed all the songs except "Je te donne", written in collaboration with Michael Jones. The album was recorded at Studio Gang by Jean-Pierre Janiau, assisted by Olivier do Espirito Santo. It was released by JRG/NEF and produced by Marc Lumbroso.

It provided three highly successful singles :"Je marche seul" (#2), "Je te donne" (#1) and "Pas toi" (#5). The album was also successful : it went straight to number-one on 6 October 1985 on the SNEP albums chart and topped for nine non consecutive weeks. It remained for 61 weeks in the top ten.

Track listing 
 Vinyl
 "Compte pas sur moi" — 5:24
 "Parler d'ma vie" — 4:53
 "La vie par procuration" — 4:12
 "Délires schizo-maniaco-psychotiques" — 3:58
 "Je marche seul" — 4:03
 "Pas toi" — 5:29
 "Je te donne" (duet with Michael Jones) — 4:24
 "Famille" — 5:22
 "Bienvenue sur mon boulevard" — 4:11
 "Confidentiel" — 2:35

 CD
 "Compte pas sur moi" — 5:26
 "Je te donne" (duet with Michael Jones) — 4:25
 "Famille" — 5:33
 "La vie par procuration" — 4:13
 "Parler d'ma vie" — 5:08
 "Pas toi" — 5:31
 "Bienvenue sur mon boulevard" — 4:14
 "Elle attend" — 3:17
 "Délires schizo-maniaco-psychotiques" — 3:59
 "Je marche seul" — 4:03
 "Confidentiel" — 2:36

Personnel 
 Roland Romanelli - accordion
 Claude Samard- banjo
 Guy Delacroix, Claude Le Péron (Je te donne) - bass guitar
 Marc Changereau, P. A. Dahan, Guy Delacroix, Christophe Deschamps, Jean-François Gauthier - drums and percussion
 Michael Jones, Guy Delacroix, J. L. Delest, P. Gaillard, Jean-Jacques Goldman, Robert Goldman, Jean-Pierre Janiaud - vocals
 Jean-Jacques Goldman - acoustic guitar
 Jean-Jacques Goldman, Michael Jones, Non Krief - electric guitar
 Georges Rodi - organ
 Jean-Yves d'Angelo, Guy Delacroix, Jean-Jacques Goldman - piano
 Guy Delacroix - programming
 Jean-Jacques Goldman, Roland Romanelli - synthesizer
 Chet Baker - trumpet
 Patrice Mondon - violin

Charts, certifications and sales

References 

1985 albums
Jean-Jacques Goldman albums